Virginia Thompson is a Canadian ice dancer. With partner William McLachlan, she is the 1960-1962 Canadian national champion and a two-time World medallist.

Competitive highlights
(with McLachlan)

References

 
 
 

Canadian female ice dancers
Living people
World Figure Skating Championships medalists
Year of birth missing (living people)